Patrick Shen (born 1975) is an American writer and director and producer. Shen is the founder of Transcendental Media.

Documentaries 
Shen directed the Emmy-nominated documentary We Served With Pride: The Chinese American Experience in WWII, a film about the Chinese American involvement in World War II. The film premiered at The Smithsonian in Washington D.C. in 1999 and would later be broadcast on PBS. While in Washington D.C. for the film's premiere, the cast and crew were invited to meet with President Clinton at the White House.

In 2001, Shen began production on his first feature-length documentary, Flight From Death. Flight from Death explores death as the root cause of much of human behavior and is inspired by the works and writings of cultural anthropologist and social theorist Ernest Becker.
 The film, narrated by actor, Gabriel Byrne, would go on to win a total of seven Best Documentary awards at U.S. film festivals. The film was released by the now defunct Go Kart Films in 2005.

Shen's second feature-length documentary, The Philosopher Kings, is about the wisdom found among janitorial workers employed by prestigious universities such as Cornell, Princeton, and Duke. In 2009 the film premiered to sold-out audiences at the AFI Silverdocs Film Festival where it was nominated for Best Documentary and received the Emerging Cinematic Vision Award from the Camden International Film Festival. The film launched a movement to support Josue Lajeunesse – one of the characters featured in the film, a Haitian immigrant employed at Princeton University – and his lifelong dream to bring clean water to his village, La Source in Haiti.

La Source, Shen's third film, premiered at AFI Silverdocs Film Festival in June 2012. The film, narrated by Oscar-nominated actor Don Cheadle, follows the journey of Josue Lajuenesse, a Princeton janitor by day and cab driver by night, as he travels back to Haiti just weeks after the 2010 Haiti earthquake to begin a project to build a clean water system for his village. Lajeunesse and the film received a standing ovation at its premiere at Silverdocs where it was nominated for the Social Impact Award.

Shen's fourth film, In Pursuit of Silence, premiered to sold-out audiences at CPH:DOX in November 2015 and in North America at South by Southwest Film Festival in March 2016. , In Pursuit of Silence opened theatrically in more than 250 theaters all over the globe throughout 2016 and 2017.

References

External links
 
Patrick Shen at Yahoo! Movies

1975 births
Living people